Lazaropole is a village in the Municipality of Mavrovo and Rostuša, North Macedonia. Situated on a plateau at Mount Bistra and surrounded by beech and oak forest; at 1,350 m altitude, it is one of the highest settlements in the country.

The village is named after a local medieval hero, Lazar, who according to legend was the sole survivor of a Turkish attack on his village. The rest of the residents were killed in a cave where they had sought refuge, while Lazar, the only survivor, crawled outside and built a new village.

There are about 400 houses in the village. The older ones reveal the traces of the Mijaci highland building style. The village was the birthplace of numerous authors, educators, carvers, teachers, fresco and icon painters, and constructors. Especially picturesque are the village , built in 1838, and the small churches in the forests near the village.

Climate

Demographics
According to the 2021 census, the village had a total of 29 inhabitants, including 28 ethnic Macedonians and one Serb.

Culture 
The traditional Macedonian folk dance Teškoto is from the area of Lazaropole.

People born in Lazaropole
Isaija Mažovski, painter and writer
, writer

, writer

See also
Galičnik

References

External links

Villages in Mavrovo and Rostuša Municipality